Williamson Valley, also known as Williamsons Valley, is a valley in Yavapai County, Arizona.

References

Landforms of Yavapai County, Arizona